The 1921 Mid Armagh by-election was held on 23 June 1921.  The by-election was held due to the death of the incumbent Ulster Unionist MP, James Rolston Lonsdale.  It was won unopposed by the UUP candidate Henry Bruce Armstrong.

References

Mid Armagh
By-elections to the Parliament of the United Kingdom in County Armagh constituencies
Unopposed by-elections to the Parliament of the United Kingdom (need citation)
20th century in County Armagh
Mid Armagh